Asbjørn Øye (21 May 1902 – 15 November 1998) was a Norwegian politician for the Liberal Party.

He served as a deputy representative to the Norwegian Parliament from Møre og Romsdal during the term 1945–1949.

References

1902 births
1998 deaths
Liberal Party (Norway) politicians
Deputy members of the Storting